Lackey may refer to:


Places
 Lackey, Kentucky, United States, an unincorporated community
 Lackey, Mississippi, United States, an unincorporated community
 Lackey, Virginia, United States, an unincorporated community
 Lackey Ridge, Antarctica

Historic American buildings
 George W. Lackey House, a historic house in Mountain View, Arkansas
 John Alexander Lackey House, a historic house in Burke County, North Carolina
 Lackey General Merchandise and Warehouse, a historic commercial building in Mountain View, Arkansas

Other uses
 Lackey (surname)
 Lackey (manservant), a uniformed domestic worker
 "Lackey" (song), by the English indie rock band The Others
 Henry E. Lackey High School, a school in Charles County, Maryland
 Lackey Field, a former baseball and athletics field at Appalachian State University
 Lackey moth, a species of moth, Malacosoma neustria
 LackeyCCG, a computer application for playing CCG's online

See also